Ernocornutia alpha is a species of moth of the family Tortricidae. It is found in Peru.

The wingspan is 18 mm. The ground colour of the forewings is cream, almost completely suffused with brown and in the distal third of the wing dotted with rust. The strigulation (fine streaking) is brown and there is a cream blotch at the base of the wing followed by a darker subcostal patch. The markings are brown. The hindwings are spotted grey.

Etymology
The species name refers to the succession of the species (cf. Ernocornutia beta).

References

Moths described in 2010
Euliini
Moths of South America
Taxa named by Józef Razowski